Kenneth Va'a Niumatalolo (born May 8, 1965) is an American football coach and former player. He is the former head coach of the Naval Academy from 2007 to 2022, accumulating the most wins in program history. Niumatalolo played college football at the University of Hawaii.   As a quarterback he led Hawaii to their first postseason bowl game in 1989.  Niumatalolo is the second person of Polynesian descent to be named head coach of an NCAA Division I FBS college football program and the first ethnic Samoan collegiate head coach on any level. Niumatalolo was inducted into the Polynesian Football Hall of Fame on January 23, 2014.

Before coaching
Ken Niumatalolo is the son of parents who were both born in American Samoa, Simi and Lamala Niumatalolo. His father, Simi, retired from the U.S. Coast Guard.

Niumatalolo was a star in both football and basketball at Radford High School in Honolulu, graduating in 1983. He went on to play at the University of Hawaii at Mānoa, eventually becoming the team's starting quarterback after serving for two years as a missionary for the Church of Jesus Christ of Latter-day Saints (LDS Church) in the California Ventura Mission. He served as a Spanish-speaking missionary. At the time, the mission covered Ventura County, California and extended northward to take in the greater Bakersfield, California area. During his time with the Rainbows at the University of Hawaii, he ran an option-oriented offense under the direction of Paul Johnson, who was then the offensive coordinator.

Coaching

Hawaii
Niumatalolo stayed on at Hawaii after his graduation, taking a position as a graduate assistant under Johnson. By 1992, he had been elevated to a full-time assistant position.

Navy
When Johnson left Hawaii to become the offensive coordinator at the Naval Academy in 1995, Niumatalolo went with him as the running backs coach. The following season, Niumatalolo was elevated to offensive coordinator after Johnson left to take the head coaching job at Georgia Southern. While the offensive coordinator at Navy, Niumatalolo tutored quarterback Chris McCoy, who set a Division I-A record in 1997 for rushing touchdowns by a quarterback with 20, a record that was broken in 2007 by Florida's Tim Tebow. On December 12, 2009, at the annual Army-Navy football game, Navy quarterback Ricky Dobbs reclaimed the record with 24 touchdowns in the 2009 season.

UNLV
In 1999, Niumatalolo left Annapolis to become an assistant at UNLV. While there, he called the plays and also worked with the kickoff return unit.

Back in Annapolis

Assistant coach
Niumatalolo returned to Navy in 2002 when he was hired by Johnson, who had just taken over the head coaching job at Annapolis, as the offensive line coach. Niumatalolo's work helped Navy establish a rushing attack that led NCAA Division I-A/FBS in yards per game in four of his first five seasons back at Navy, including an unprecedented three consecutive seasons leading the nation in that category (2004 through 2006).  In 2008, Navy averaged 292.4 yards per game on the ground, leading the nation for the fourth straight year in the category.

This rushing game helped Navy football reach a level of success it had not seen in decades. Navy went 45–29 under Johnson and appeared in a bowl game every year from 2003 through Johnson's last season in Annapolis in 2007. The Mids also won the Commander-in-Chief's Trophy, the annual football trophy contested by Navy, Army and Air Force, from 2003 through 2007.

The 2006 first-class midshipmen (seniors, Class of 2007) went 8–0 against the other academies during their careers at Navy. The Class of 2009 repeated this achievement during the 2008 season with the seventh straight victory over Army and the sixth straight victory over Air Force. Under Johnson, Navy also ended the Mids' long losing streak against Notre Dame in 2007 with a 46–44 triple-overtime win.

Head coach
Niumatalolo was promoted to head football coach at the Naval Academy on December 8, 2007, by Naval Academy Director of Athletics Chet Gladchuk after Johnson departed for Georgia Tech. Niumatalolo becaome the 38th head football coach in Naval Academy history. On January 7, 2009, Niumatalolo was given a contract extension, although terms and length of the extension were not released.

With Niumatalolo as Navy's head coach, beginning with the 2008 season, the Mids have continued their run of success. Highlights in 2008 included an upset in Winston-Salem over #16 Wake Forest, 24–17, the Mids' first victory over a ranked team in 23 years, and a 34–0 shutout victory of Army.

Other highlights of Niumatalolo's years as head coach at Navy include:

 Navy defeated Army in each of Niumatalolo's first nine seasons as head coach, not losing to Army until 2016. The 2016 loss ended a streak of 14 Midshipmen wins in the Army–Navy Game, the longest winning streak for either side in the rivalry.
 The Midshipmen captured the Commander-in-Chief's Trophy in 2008, 2009 and 2012. They went on to capture the trophy outright in 2013, with a 34–7 win against Army, and recaptured it outright in 2015 with wins over Army and Air Force.
 The Midshipmen have nine winning seasons during Niumatalolo's 10 full years as head coach. The Mids have played in nine bowl games during Niumatalolo's tenure, winning the 2009 Texas Bowl, 2013 Armed Forces Bowl, 2014 Poinsettia Bowl, and 2015 Military Bowl.
 Navy defeated longtime rival Notre Dame in consecutive years, 2009 and 2010, for the first time since the early 1960s. The Midshipmen also defeated Notre Dame in 2016.

Navy announced on December 11, 2022, that Niumatololo would not be retained for the 2023 season, a day after an overtime loss to Army and following the third consecutive season of four wins or fewer. He was succeeded as Navy's head coach by Brian Newberry.

Personal life
Niumatalolo resides in Annapolis with his wife, Barbara, daughter, Alexcia, and sons, Va'a and Ali'i. Ali'i is an administrative assistant for the University of Utah football team. Va'a played football at BYU and was a graduate assistant at Hawaii. Va'a is currently the assistant to the director of football operations for the Navy Midshipmen. Ali'i currently plays football at Utah. Niumatalolo's mother, Lamala, died in September 2013, while his brother James died December 29, 2015, in a drowning accident while swimming in the ocean near their hometown of Laie, Hawaii. Niumatalolo is a member of the LDS Church. He is one of the six main people featured in the documentary film Meet the Mormons.  Among other callings in the LDS Church, Niumatalolo has served as the Young Men president in his ward in Maryland, as a counselor in a bishopric, and since January 2019, as president of the church's Annapolis, Maryland Stake.

Head coaching record

References

External links

 Navy profile

1965 births
Living people
American football quarterbacks
Hawaii Rainbow Warriors football coaches
Hawaii Rainbow Warriors football players
Navy Midshipmen football coaches
UNLV Rebels football coaches
Admiral Arthur W. Radford High School alumni
People from Laie
Sportspeople from Honolulu
Coaches of American football from Hawaii
Players of American football from Honolulu
American sportspeople of Samoan descent
Latter Day Saints from Hawaii
Latter Day Saints from Maryland